Víctor Erice Aras (born 30 June 1940) is a Spanish film director. He is best known for his two feature fiction films, The Spirit of the Beehive (1973), which many regard as one of the greatest Spanish films ever made, and El Sur (1983).

Early life
Erice was born in Karrantza, Biscay. He studied law, political science, and economics at the University of Madrid. He also attended the Escuela Oficial de Cinematografia in 1963 to study film direction.

Career
He wrote film criticism and reviews for the Spanish film journal Nuestro Cine, and made a series of short films before making his first feature film, The Spirit of the Beehive (1973), a critical portrait of 1940s rural Spain.

Erice was among other filmmakers, such as Luis Buñuel, who lived in “such restricted societies as Franco’s Spain,” to take aim at the authoritarian rule in power. At the time his first film was released in 1973, Francisco Franco was still in power. One of the things The Spirit of the Beehive is known for is its use of symbolism to portray what life was like in Spain under Franco’s rule. Setting the movie in 1940, at the start of Franco’s rule, was a risk for Erice, given that the film “wasn’t a propagandist effort in which stalwart Francoists won victories against evil, priest-massacring Republicans.”

Ten years later, Erice wrote and directed El Sur (1983), based on a story from Adelaida García Morales, another highly regarded film, although the producer Elías Querejeta only allowed him to film the first two-thirds of the story. His third movie, The Quince Tree Sun (1992) is a documentary about painter Antonio López García. The film won the Jury Prize and the FIPRESCI Prize at the 1992 Cannes Film Festival.

Erice worked in the development of (and was set to direct) The Shanghai Spell, the adaptation of the Juan Marsé's namesake novel, but producer Andrés Vicente Gómez eventually tasked the project to Fernando Trueba instead. This rejection entailed "a great deal of frustration" for Erice.

He was a member of the jury at the 2010 Cannes Film Festival in May.

At the 2014 Locarno Film Festival, Erice was awarded with a Golden Leopard award for lifetime achievement.

In July 2022, thirty years after his last full-length film, a project for a new Erice film (Cerrar los ojos) supported by Pecado Films, Tándem Films, Nautilus as well as Canal Sur was revealed to be in development, reportedly in a "very early stage".

Critics
Geoff Andrew, in the Time Out Film Guide, praises Erice's contribution to Ten Minutes Older: The Trumpet (Lifeline) as "quite masterly", adding "it only makes you wish he worked more frequently". Excluding that short film, he has produced only three major works: The Spirit of the Beehive (1973), El Sur (1983) and Dream of Light (1992, The Quince Tree Sun). Critic Tony Rayns describes The Spirit of the Beehive as "a haunting mood piece that dispenses with plot and works its spells through intricate patterns of sound and image" and of El Sur it has been said that "Erice creates his film as a canvas, conjuring painterly images of slow dissolves and shafts of light that match Caravaggio in their power to animate a scene of stillness, or freeze one of mad movement".

Legacy 
Erice's work portraying children dreaming and their attraction to fantastic worlds during and around times like the Spanish Civil War would go on to influence Guillermo del Toro and his respective films, including The Devil's Backbone, and Pan's Labyrinth.

Filmography

Shorts
Sea-Mail, 2007
La Morte Rouge, 2006
Alumbramiento, 2002
Entre Vías, 1966
Los Días Perdidos, 1963
Páginas De Un Diario Perdido, 1962
On The Terrace, 1961

Awards 
Jury Prize, 1992 Cannes Film Festival

FIRPRESCI Prize, 1992 Cannes Film Festival

Golden Leopard for lifetime achievement

References

External links
An essay about the films of Victor Erice
BFI interviews with Geoff Andrew

 30 años en la colmena
 Erice/Kiarostami: Correspondencias
 Erice, Angelopoulos, Kiarostami

1940 births
Living people
People from Enkarterri
Film directors from the Basque Country (autonomous community)
Spanish film directors
Complutense University of Madrid alumni